Alvise Da Mosto was one of twelve s, built for the  (Royal Italian Navy) between the late 1920s and the early 1930s. During World War II, she participated in several minelaying missions in the Sicilian Channel and escorted convoys between Italy and Libya until her sinking by the British Force K.

Design and description
Their complement during wartime was 222–225 officers and enlisted men.

The Navigatoris were powered by two Belluzzo geared steam turbines, each driving one propeller shaft using steam supplied by four Yarrow boilers.

Their main battery consisted of six  guns in three twin-gun turrets, one each fore and aft of the superstructure and the third amidships. Anti-aircraft (AA) defense for the Navigatori-class ships was provided by a pair of  AA guns in single mounts abreast the forward funnel and a pair of twin-gun mounts for  machine guns. They were equipped with six  torpedo tubes in two triple mounts amidships. The Navigatoris could carry 86–104 mines.

Construction and career

Alvise Da Mosto, built at the Cantieri Riuniti del Quarnaro in Fiume, was laid down on 22 August 1928, launched on 1 July 1929 and completed on 15 March 1931. As the destroyer was the next-to-last of her class to enter service, she had already received the modifications that her sisterships needed after completion in order to improve stability and seaworthiness.

During the 1930s, Da Mosto operated with the Italian fleet for most of the time, taking part in naval exercises. She also sailed to South America for an official visit together with sister ship Emanuele Pessagno. Between 1936 and 1937 she participated in Italian naval operations linked to the Spanish Civil War, escorting ships that carried troops and supplies for Francisco Franco's forces from Italy to Spain.

Originally classified as an esploratore (flotilla leader/scout cruiser), Da Mosto was re-rated as a destroyer in 1938.

World War II 

When Italy entered World War II, on 10 June 1940, Da Mosto was undergoing modification work to her bow in the La Spezia Naval Arsenal, and she only re-entered service in August 1940, and was assigned to the 15th Destroyer Division.

On 1–2 September 1940 Da Mosto was part of the Italian force that sortied to counter British Operation "Hats", and at the end of the same month she participated in the contrast to British operation "MB 5".

Between April and August 1941 Da Mosto, together with some of her sisterships and the light cruisers of the 7th Cruiser Division, took part in the laying of several minefields in the Sicilian Channel and off the coast of Tripolitania. In the same period, she also escorted some supply convoys to Libya. In November 1941 she was equipped with a German S-Gerat sonar.

On 30 November 1941, Da Mosto sailed from Trapani to escort to Tripoli the tanker Iridio Mantovani, carrying, 8,600 tons of fuel for the Axis forces in North Africa. On 1 December, just before sunset, Mantovani was crippled by Bristol Blenheim bombers of the Royal Air Force; Da Mosto tried to take her in tow, but another air strike set the tanker on fire, and she had to be abandoned by her crew. Shortly thereafter, Da Mosto was attacked by the British Force K, consisting of the cruisers Aurora and Penelope and the destroyer Lively. Da Mosto engaged the British ships in a last attempt to save as many survivors as possible from the sinking tanker, but was hit multiple times, including in one of her magazines, and quickly sank at 18:15 in 33°53' N, 12°28' E, about 75 miles northwest of Tripoli. Mantovani's blazing wreck was also finished off by Force K.

138 members of Da Mosto's crew were killed, while 125 survivors were later rescued by the Italian torpedo boat . Da Mosto's commanding officer, Commander Francesco Dell'Anno, was awarded the Gold Medal of Military Valor for his attempt to defend Mantovani against overwhelming forces.

References

Bibliography

External links
 Alvise da Mosto Marina Militare website

Navigatori-class destroyers
Ships built in Italy
1929 ships
World War II destroyers of Italy
Maritime incidents in December 1941